Sayre Gomez (born 1982) is a contemporary American artist who lives and works in Los Angeles.

Early life and career
Sayre Gomez was born in Chicago, Illinois in 1982. He holds a BFA from the School of the Art Institute of Chicago and an MFA from the California Institute of the Arts.

Work
Sayre Gomez works across mediums, including painting, sculpture, and video, to address themes of perception and representation. His works often deploy a range of painting techniques drawn omnivorously from Hollywood set painting, commercial sign painting, automotive airbrushing, and other traditions. The city of Los Angeles serves as a frequent setting and subject, given homage through references to roadside signage, car culture, fantastical sunsets, and other aspects of Angeleno visual culture. Recurring metaphors such as windows, doors, gates, and walls are often used in Gomez's work as part of an investigation into the role of context in the distribution and legibility of images in the 21st century.

Publications
Sayre Gomez: Halloween City. Published in conjunction with the exhibition: Sayre Gomez, Halloween City at Francois Ghebaly Gallery, 2022. 

Sayre Gomez: WORLD. Edited by Galerie Nagel Draxler, with texts by Giampaolo Bianconi, CAWD, Maurin Dietrich, Rita Gonzalez. Verlag der Buchhandlung Walther und Franz König, 2021.

Sayre Gomez: Déjà Vu. Published in conjunction with the exhibition, Sayre Gomez, Déjà Vu, by Francois Ghebaly Gallery, 2018.

External links
 Artist's site

References

American artists
1982 births
Living people
School of the Art Institute of Chicago alumni